Kodanad is a rural riverside village of Ernakulam district in Kerala, South India. It is 18 km from Angamaly. Kodanad is situated on the south bank of Periyar river, about 42 kilometers east of Kochi. The village is a major tourist destination because it houses an Elephant training center.

Location

Transportation

Kodanad has got private bus services to places inside and outside Ernakulam District and run into several neighbouring towns. There are frequent bus services to Perumbavoor from here. AutoRickshaws are commonly used for small distances. The nearest railway stations are Angamaly and Aluva. The Cochin International Airport at Nedumbassery is only 16 km from the Kodanad Elephant training centre. KL-40 is the RTO code for Kunnathunad Taluk and Perumbavoor. Perumbavoor JRTO is at Pattal. 
 
Kodanad is surrounded by many small but populous commuter villages, notably Koovappady, Thottuva, Alattuchira, Panamkuzhy, Cheranalloor, Kurichilakode, Kaprikad, etc. Vallam town, is one of the main interchange points for public transport.

The nearest airport is Cochin International Airport which is about 20 km (12 mi) by road.

History 

In the 1950–60s, Kodanad used to be the largest of several elephant training centres for captured elephants from the adjoining forest regions. They were trained using Mahouts, specially skilled people also known as 'Paappaan' in Malayalam language. In the 1970s, there was a ban to elephant capture by Government of India and from then on, Kodanad was primarily used as a rescue training centre. As of 2017, all the animals have been shifted to nearby Abhayaranyam facility.

Demographics 

According to the 2011 census of India, Kodanad has 3502 households. The literacy rate of the village is 84.63%.

Kaprikkad Ecotourism project

Kodanad is in the list of Ecotourism destination projects sponsored by the Government of India. As a part of this project, Kaprikkad, a village lying 3 km adjacent to Kodanad on the river bank has been set up in 2006 for entertaining visitors in the most natural and environmental friendly way.

Abhayaranyam Mini Zoo, Kaprikkad

Most of the animals from Kodanad elephant centre including the elephants have been recently rehabilitated to Kaprikkad, as the part of Ecotourism project named as Abhayaranyam, which is spread across 200 acres of natural forest. The project was inaugurated on 18 February 2011 by the Minister of Forestry and Housing, Shri. Binoy Vishwom. You can find Spotted deers, Sambar deers and young elephants here.
Abhayaranyam extends for an area of 2.5 acres on the bank river of river periyar .

Education
Baselius Augen Public School, Kodanad

Places of worship
Temples
kodanad shiva temple,
chettinada saraswathi temple, 
kunnumpuram ayyappa temple,
edavanakavu temple, 
pancheswara Vishnu temple.

Churches
Mar Malkhe Orthodox Church, Kodanad.
 Zion Asram, Kodanad
St. Antony's Syro-Malabar Church, Kodanad
St. Thomas Church, Malayatoor (2 km)
Bethlehem St. Marys Jacobite Syrian Orthodox Church, Alattuchira

Nearby places 
Malayattoor Pilgrim 3 km
Kaprikad 3 km
Paniyeli poru 15 km
Airport 16 km
Angamaly 19 km
Muvattupuzha 21 km
Varapuzha (Paravur) 33 km
Piravom 34 km
North Paravur 36 km
Kochi City 38 km
Poochackal പൂച്ചാക്കല് 43 km
Aroor 43 km
Kodungallur 50 km
Perumbavoor 11 km

References 

Villages in Ernakulam district
Elephant reserves of India